Alfredo Paolo Dumlao  Vargas III (born October 24, 1979), professionally known as Alfred Vargas, is a Filipino politician, actor, and model serving as a councilor of Quezon City from the 5th district since 2022. He previously served as a city councilor from the 2nd district from 2010 to 2013 and as representative from the 5th district from 2013 to 2022. As an actor, he is known for his portrayal of Aquil and Amarro in the Encantadia franchise.

Biography and Career
Vargas was born on October 24, 1979 in San Juan, Metro Manila to Alfredo "Freddieboy" Vargas, Jr. and Atty. Susana Dumlao-Vargas.

He graduated in A.B. Management Economics in Ateneo de Manila University. For his graduate studies, he went to the University of the Philippines Diliman and earned his master's degree in Public Administration.

As an actor, he started his career as a member of ABS-CBN Star Magic (formerly Star Circle) acting workshop Batch 10. From there, he had his TV role in the drama soap opera, Pangako Sa'yo, from the same network. But this Ateneo de Manila graduate was acting in theatre long before the talent scouts lured him into television.

His breakthrough role came in the film Bridal Shower. After this, Vargas moved to the GMA Network where he featured in three shows in Philippine television: the daytime drama series, Daisy Siete, the fantasy series, Encantadia (as Aquil), and its prequel series Etheria (as Amarro, Aquil's father).

He played the leading role on the GMA daytime series Muli, opposite the Malaysian actress Carrie Lee and Marian Rivera as well as being part of the cast of Impostora in 2007.  In 2008, he worked again with Marian Rivera in Dyesebel.  He is also part of the upcoming installment of Una Kang Naging Akin co-starring Angelika dela Cruz, in which he plays "Ronnie".

His most recent movie projects include Status: Single and When I Met U. He is set to do an indie film, Amamanhig. In 2009, he appeared in All About Eve where he is reunited with his Impostora castmates Sunshine Dizon, Iza Calzado, and Mark Anthony Fernandez. He then made a villainous turn when he played the pirate captain Lima Wong in Zorro. He went on to play "Gabriel" in Darna but had to leave the series as he applied for candidacy for councilor.

In 2010, Alfred Vargas was reappearing in "Darna", becoming a successful reporter. In December 2010, he returned to ABS-CBN and did projects for the network without contract as he was a public servant serving and cannot be exclusive. In January 2017, he returned to his home network GMA Network and it would serve as Vargas comeback project after being on a hiatus for two years. This led to a familiar role as "Amarro", the father of Aquil in Encantadia's remake.

He was working on a GMA soap opera, which turned out to be Kambal, Karibal while still balancing his congressional work.

Politics

In Quezon City local elections for District 2 on May 10, 2010, he was elected city councilor, with the second-highest number of votes in the district.

Vargas won for the Congress in 2013, due to reapportioning from 2nd district to newly created 5th district of Quezon City which consist parts of Novaliches area, under the administration (LP/NP/NPC/NUP) coalition. His opponents were former old 2nd district Representatives Annie Rosa Susano (of Lakas) and Dante Liban (of the United Nationalist Alliance).

In 2016, Vargas ran for another term unopposed. He garnered 85% of the votes, a very high statistic considering he was an unopposed candidate.

In 2017, he left the Liberal Party for PDP–Laban, the ruling party under President Rodrigo Duterte. In 2019, Vargas was reelected under the local ticket of Hugpong ng Pagbabago, defeating 4 other candidates.

He has passed Republic Acts including RA 10931 Universal Access to Quality Tertiary Education Act, RA 10645 mandating PhilHealth coverage for all senior citizens, RA 10747 Rare Diseases Act of the Philippines. He constantly campaigns for vulnerable sector such as Persons With Disabilities and cancer patients. Likewise, he is known to push for traffic alleviation through Point-to-Point or P2P methods.

Being term-limited, Vargas ran for councilor and switched places with his brother, councilor Patrick Michael Vargas, in 2022. They both won in the elections.

House Committee and Memberships

Republic Acts

Serving two terms as a Congressman of District 5, Quezon City, Rep. Alfred Vargas was able to pass 17 Republic Acts:

Filmography

Television

Film

Awards
As a public servant, Congressman Alfred Vargas garnered the following awards:
2013 MWWF Gintong Palad Award for Public Service
Dekada Awardee, Gallery of Distinction, Golden Screen Awards
Most Outstanding City Councilor, Manuel L. Quezon Bantayog Award, 2013
Most Outstanding Councilor, Manuel L. Quezon Bantayog Award, 2012
Special Award for Excellence in Public Service for 2012, Aliw Awards Foundation, Inc.
Gintong Kabataan Award, Bulacan Outstanding Youth Achievement Award, 2008
Outstanding Surigaonon Award for Theater and Arts, Rotary Club, 2007

He won the following as an actor:
Best Actor, 10th Golden Screen Awards for Supremo
Eastwood Walk of Fame Award, 2012
Huwarang Artista sa Larangan ng Serbisyo Publiko, Famas Awards, 2012
Dangal ng Lipi Award, 2010 Best Actor, MTRCB, 2010
Best Actor Nominee, Gawad Urian Awards, 2010
Top 10 Bachelors of 2007, Cosmopolitan Magazine
Breakthrough Performance by an Actor, Golden Screen Awards, 2004
2nd Golden Screen Entertainment TV Awards of Enpress – Outstanding Supporting Actor in a Drama series for Encantadia (nominated, tied with Pen Medina)
Gawad Urian – Best Supporting Actor for Bridal Shower (nominated)
Golden Screen Award – Breakthrough Performance by an Actor for Bridal Shower (won)
2012 35th Gawad Urian Awards – Best Actor (Pinakamahusay na Pangunahing Aktor) for Teoriya'' (nominated)

References

External links

1981 births
Living people
Ateneo de Manila University alumni
Filipino male film actors
Filipino male television actors
Filipino male models
People from San Juan, Metro Manila
Star Magic
ABS-CBN personalities
GMA Network personalities
Filipino actor-politicians
People from Quezon City
Male actors from Metro Manila
Quezon City Council members
Members of the House of Representatives of the Philippines from Quezon City